Yintan railway station is a railway station located in Danzhou, Hainan, China. It is an intermediate stop on the Hainan western ring high-speed railway. It opened with the line on 30 December 2015.

References 

Railway stations in Hainan
Railway stations in China opened in 2015